Synthetic genomics is a nascent field of synthetic biology that uses aspects of genetic modification on pre-existing life forms, or artificial gene synthesis to create new DNA or entire lifeforms.

Overview
Synthetic genomics is unlike genetic modification in the sense that it does not use naturally occurring genes in its life forms. It may make use of custom designed base pair series, though in a more expanded and presently unrealized sense synthetic genomics could utilize genetic codes that are not composed of the two base pairs of DNA that are currently used by life.

The development of synthetic genomics is related to certain recent technical abilities and technologies in the field of genetics. The ability to construct long base pair chains cheaply and accurately on a large scale has allowed researchers to perform experiments on genomes that do not exist in nature. Coupled with the developments in protein folding models and decreasing computational costs the field synthetic genomics is beginning to enter a productive stage of vitality.

History

Researchers were able to create a synthetic organism for the first time in 2010. This breakthrough was undertaken by Synthetic Genomics, Inc., which continues to specialize in the research and commercialization of custom designed genomes. It was accomplished by synthesizing a 600 kbp genome (resembling that of Mycoplasma genitalium, save the insertion of a few watermarks) via the Gibson Assembly method and Transformation Associated Recombination.

Recombinant DNA technology
Soon after the discovery of restriction endonucleases and ligases, the field of genetics began using these molecular tools to assemble artificial sequences from smaller fragments of synthetic or naturally-occurring DNA. The advantage in using the recombinatory approach as opposed to continual DNA synthesis stems from the inverse relationship that exists between synthetic DNA length and percent purity of that synthetic length. In other words, as you synthesize longer sequences, the number of error-containing clones increases due to the inherent error rates of current technologies. Although recombinant DNA technology is more commonly used in the construction of fusion proteins and plasmids, several techniques with larger capacities have emerged, allowing for the construction of entire genomes.

Polymerase cycling assembly 
Polymerase cycling assembly (PCA) uses a series of oligonucleotides (or oligos), approximately 40 to 60 nucleotides long, that altogether constitute both strands of the DNA being synthesized. These oligos are designed such that a single oligo from one strand contains a length of approximately 20 nucleotides at each end that is complementary to sequences of two different oligos on the opposite strand, thereby creating regions of overlap. The entire set is processed through cycles of: (a) hybridization at 60 °C; (b) elongation via Taq polymerase and a standard ligase; and (c) denaturation at 95 °C, forming progressively longer contiguous strands and ultimately resulting in the final genome. PCA was used to generate the first synthetic genome in history, that of the Phi X 174 virus.

Gibson assembly method  
The Gibson assembly method, designed by Daniel Gibson during his time at the J. Craig Venter Institute, requires a set of double-stranded DNA cassettes that constitute the entire genome being synthesized. Note that cassettes differ from contigs by definition, in that these sequences contain regions of homology to other cassettes for the purposes of recombination. In contrast to Polymerase Cycling Assembly, Gibson Assembly is a single-step, isothermal reaction with larger sequence-length capacity; ergo, it is used in place of Polymerase Cycling Assembly for genomes larger than 6 kb.

A T5 exonuclease performs a chew-back reaction at the terminal segments, working in the 5' to 3' direction, thereby producing complementary overhangs. The overhangs hybridize to each other, a Phusion DNA polymerase fills in any missing nucleotides and the nicks are sealed with a ligase. However, the genomes capable of being synthesized using this method alone is limited because as DNA cassettes increase in length, they require propagation in vitro in order to continue hybridizing; accordingly, Gibson assembly is often used in conjunction with transformation-associated recombination (see below) to synthesize genomes several hundred kilobases in size.

Transformation-associated recombination 
The goal of transformation-associated recombination (TAR) technology in synthetic genomics is to combine DNA contigs by means of homologous recombination performed by the yeast artificial chromosome (YAC). Of importance is the CEN element within the YAC vector, which corresponds to the yeast centromere. This sequence gives the vector the ability to behave in a chromosomal manner, thereby allowing it to perform homologous recombination. First, gap repair cloning is performed to generate regions of homology flanking the DNA contigs. Gap Repair Cloning is a particular form of the polymerase chain reaction in which specialized primers with extensions beyond the sequence of the DNA target are utilized. Then, the DNA cassettes are exposed to the YAC vector, which drives the process of homologous recombination, thereby connecting the DNA cassettes. Polymerase Cycling Assembly and TAR technology were used together to construct the 600 kb Mycoplasma genitalium genome in 2008, the first synthetic organism ever created. Similar steps were taken in synthesizing the larger Mycoplasma mycoides genome a few years later.

Unnatural base pair (UBP) 

An unnatural base pair (UBP) is a designed subunit (or nucleobase) of DNA which is created in a laboratory and does not occur in nature. In 2012, a group of American scientists led by Floyd E. Romesberg, a chemical biologist at the Scripps Research Institute in San Diego, California, published that his team designed an unnatural base pair (UBP).  The two new artificial nucleotides or Unnatural Base Pair (UBP) were named d5SICS and dNaM. More technically, these artificial nucleotides bearing hydrophobic nucleobases, feature two fused aromatic rings that form a (d5SICS–dNaM) complex or base pair in DNA. In 2014 the same team from the Scripps Research Institute reported that they synthesized a stretch of circular DNA known as a plasmid containing natural T-A and C-G base pairs along with the best-performing UBP Romesberg's laboratory had designed, and inserted it into cells of the common bacterium E. coli that successfully replicated the unnatural base pairs through multiple generations. This is the first known example of a living organism passing along an expanded genetic code to subsequent generations.  This was in part achieved by the addition of a supportive algal gene that expresses a nucleotide triphosphate transporter which efficiently imports the triphosphates of both d5SICSTP and dNaMTP into E. coli bacteria. Then, the natural bacterial replication pathways use them to accurately replicate the plasmid containing d5SICS–dNaM.

The successful incorporation of a third base pair is a significant breakthrough toward the goal of greatly expanding the number of amino acids which can be encoded by DNA, from the existing 20 amino acids to a theoretically possible 172, thereby expanding the potential for living organisms to produce novel proteins. The artificial strings of DNA do not encode for anything yet, but scientists speculate they could be designed to manufacture new proteins which could have industrial or pharmaceutical uses.

Computer-made form
In April 2019, scientists at ETH Zurich reported the creation of the world's first bacterial genome, named Caulobacter ethensis-2.0, made entirely by a computer, although a related viable form of C. ethensis-2.0 does not yet exist.

See also
 Artificial gene synthesis
 Artificially Expanded Genetic Information System
 Bioroid
 Genetic engineering
 Hachimoji DNA
 Synthetic biological circuit
 Synthetic genomes

References

External links
Synthetic Genomes: Technologies and Impact - A 2004 study completed for the DOE on the subject.
Effects of Developments in Synthetic Genomics: Hearing before the Committee on Energy and Commerce, House of Representatives, One Hundred Eleventh Congress, Second Session, May 27, 2010

Algae biomass producers
Emerging technologies
Genetic engineering
Genome editing
Synthetic biology